Donald Hunter Walker (10 September 1935 – 21 December 2011) was a Scottish professional footballer, who played as a wing half.

References

1935 births
2011 deaths
Footballers from Edinburgh
Scottish footballers
Association football wing halves
Tranent Juniors F.C. players
Leicester City F.C. players
Middlesbrough F.C. players
Grimsby Town F.C. players
Ashford United F.C. players
Rugby Town F.C. (1945) players
English Football League players